The 2021 ASUN women's basketball tournament was the 35th edition of the ASUN Conference championship. It took place March 10–14, 2021, in the KSU Convocation Center in Kennesaw, Georgia. Florida Gulf Coast won the tournament, its seventh title, receiving the league's automatic bid to the 2021 NCAA tournament.

Seeds

Schedule

Bracket

* denotes overtime

See also
2020–21 NCAA Division I women's basketball season
ASUN women's basketball tournament
2021 ASUN men's basketball tournament

References

External links 
Championship Details

ASUN women's basketball tournament
2020–21 ASUN Conference women's basketball season
Basketball in Georgia (U.S. state)